Léon Joseph Aelter (born  6 January 1890) was a male sprinter from Belgium.

Aelter competed for his home nation at the 1912 Summer Olympics in Stockholm, Sweden. He finished third in his heat in the 200 metres, failing to qualify for the following round. He finished second in his heat in the 100 metres qualifying, qualifying for the semi final, which he was unable to finish.

References

External links
sports-reference.com

Belgian male sprinters
Olympic athletes of Belgium
Athletes (track and field) at the 1912 Summer Olympics
1890 births
Year of death missing